The 2015–16 Ascenso MX season is a two-part competition: Apertura 2019 began 25 July 2015 and Clausura 2020. Ascenso MX is the second-tier football league of Mexico. All Ascenso MX teams except FC Juárez and Cimarrones de Sonora, will participate in Copa MX.

Changes from the previous season

 Dorados de Sinaloa were promoted to Liga MX.
 Club Universidad de Guadalajara were relegated from Liga MX.
 Loros de la Universidad de Colima were promoted from Segunda División de México (will join in 2016–17 season).
 Altamira F.C. were moved to Tapachula, Chiapas and rebranded to Cafetaleros de Tapachula
 Irapuato F.C. were rebranded to Murciélagos F.C. and moved to Los Mochis, Sinaloa.
 Mérida F.C. now be changing logo and will be called Venados F.C. (keeping the venue in Mérida).
 Cimarrones de Sonora and FC Juárez were promoted to Ascenso MX as expansion teams.

Stadia and locations

Personnel and kits

Managerial changes

Apertura 2015

Results

Liguilla (Playoffs)
The six best teams after the first place play two games against each other on a home-and-away basis. The winner of each match up is determined by aggregate score. If the teams are tied, the Away goals rule applies.

The teams were seeded one to seven in quarterfinals, and will be re-seeded one to four in semifinals, depending on their position in the general table. The higher seeded teams play on their home field during the second leg.

 If the two teams are tied after both legs, the away goals rule applies. If both teams still tied, higher seeded team advances.
 Teams are re-seeded every round.
 The winner will qualify to the playoff match vs (Clausura 2016 Champions) . However, if the winner is the same in both tournaments, they would be the team promoted to the 2016–17 Liga MX season without playing the Promotional Final

Quarter-finals

All times are UTC−6 except for matches in Cancún, Ciudad Juárez and Los Mochis.

First leg

Second leg

Semi-finals

First leg

Second leg

Final

First leg

Second leg

Clausura 2016

Results

Liguilla (Playoffs)
The six best teams after the first place play two games against each other on a home-and-away basis. The winner of each match up is determined by aggregate score. If the teams are tied, the Away goals rule applies.

The teams were seeded one to seven in quarterfinals, and will be re-seeded one to four in semifinals, depending on their position in the general table. The higher seeded teams play on their home field during the second leg.

 If the two teams are tied after both legs, the away goals rule applies. If both teams still tied, higher seeded team advances.
 Teams are re-seeded every round.
 The winner will qualify to the playoff match vs (F.C. Juárez)

Quarter-finals

First leg

Second leg

Semi-finals

First leg

Second leg

Final

First leg

Second leg

Promotional final

First Leg

Second leg

Relegation table 
The  team would normally be the team with the lowest ratio by summing the points scored in the following tournaments: Apertura 2013, Clausura 2014, Apertura 2014, Clausura 2015, Apertura 2015 and Clausura 2016. This Season, no team will be relegated to Liga Premier de Ascenso (will resume next season).

References 

 http://espndeportes.espn.go.com/futbol/resultados?liga=mex.2

External links
Liga MX & Ascenso MX Official Website

Ascenso MX seasons